Asish Rai (born 27 January 1999), is an Indian professional footballer who plays as a defender for Indian Super League club ATK Mohun Bagan.

Club career

Early life and youth career 
Rai was born in Pakyong, a small village in Sikkim. He always liked to play football, even as a kid. He got interested in the game by his uncle, who played football himself.

He was selected by a local academy in his state at the age of 12. He travelled to Delhi to play in the Subroto Cup, spent a couple of years there before joining the Pune Academy which was later converted into the Pune City Academy. Since, Pune City already had experienced players in the right-back position, they loaned him out to Indian Arrows.

Indian Arrows

2017–18 season 
On 29 November 2017, Rai was selected to play for the Indian Arrows, an All India Football Federation owned team that would consist of India under-20 players to give them playing time. He made his professional debut for the side on 26 December 2017, against Shillong Lajong. He started and played the full match as Indian Arrows won 3–0. 

In his debut season, Rai made ten appearances, one in the 2018 Indian Super Cup for the Arrows. Although they finished bottom of the table in the I-League, they impressed with their gameplay and football.

2018–19 season 
On 5 November 2018, he scored his first goal for the club in only his second appearance of the season against Shillong Lajong, which eventually was the winning goal as the Arrows won 1-0. He featured in all 20 matches of the 2018–19 I-League campaign and also a couple in the 2019 Indian Super Cup, as he became a permanent fixture in the right full-back position. The team improved from the season before and picked up 21 points to finish eighth in the points table.

Hyderabad

2019–20 season 
Rai went back to the reserves team of Pune City, and when the club was dissolved in the summer of 2019, their replacement club Hyderabad signed him for their first team. He made his professional debut for the club on 25 October 2019, against ATK in a 5-0 loss. On 8 December 2019, Hyderabad head coach Phil Brown heaped praise on Rai after he put in a splendid display in the right-back position, in their narrow 1-0 defeat against Goa.

The debut season of Hyderabad was a devastating one for the club and the fans, most of the Indian players didn’t play in their preferred position and one of them was Rai. He played as a left-back, right-back and on the wings, too. He played 14 games for them in the 2019–20 Indian Super League season. Due to the unstableness in the squad, tactics and many other factors, he wasn’t able to perform up to the mark and couldn’t give his best.

On 17 February 2020, Rai signed a three-year extension with the club, till May 2023.

2020–21 season 
Rai and Hyderabad set the stage alight in the 2020-21 Indian Super League season, under the stewardship of Manolo Márquez. The second season was a huge improvement for the outfit from the inaugural 2019-20 campaign, where they had finished last in the standings. Despite staying in contention for the playoffs throughout, the Nizams missed out on qualification on the final day due to a string of draws and dropped points.

Rai was in sensational form throughout the season until he picked up a season-ending knee injury against Kerala Blasters, on 16 February 2021. The right-back’s industry on the flank and constant threat in the attacking third made him a tough operator for the opposition to contain. He featured in 18 matches of the 2020-21 Indian Super League campaign and also racked up two assists in the process. Head coach Márquez called Rai "the most improved player" of last season.

ATK Mohun Bagan
Rai moved to another Indian Super League side ATK Mohun Bagan in 2022. He made his debut for the club on 20 August against Rajasthan United at the 131st edition of Durand Cup and they were defeated by 3–2.

Career statistics

Club

References

1999 births
Living people
Indian footballers
Footballers from Sikkim
Pune FC players
FC Pune City players
Indian Arrows players
Association football defenders
I-League players
India youth international footballers
Indian Super League players
Hyderabad FC players
ATK Mohun Bagan FC players